Hallie Marie Jackson (born April 29, 1984) is Senior Washington Correspondent for NBC News, an anchor for NBC News Now, a fill-in and substitute anchor for Today, Sunday Today With Willie Geist, and NBC Nightly News. She worked in Salisbury, Maryland; Dover, Delaware; Hartford, Connecticut; New Haven, Connecticut; and Baltimore, Maryland, before joining NBC News in 2014.

Early life and education
Jackson was born on April 29, 1984, in Yardley, Pennsylvania, the daughter of Heidi and David Jackson. In 2002, she graduated from Pennsbury High School. In 2006, Jackson graduated Phi Beta Kappa from Johns Hopkins University with a B.A. degree in political science.

Career
Jackson started her journalism career at WBOC-TV, in Salisbury, Maryland, and Dover, Delaware, in 2006, until her departure for WFSB, in Hartford and New Haven, Connecticut, during 2008. Her career led her in 2012 to Hearst Corporation, where she reported for their 26 stations from Washington, D.C. In 2014, Jackson became a reporter and journalist for NBC News, for which she covered the Ted Cruz presidential campaign for the network as their embedded reporter. In late summer 2016, Jackson began anchoring the 1 p.m. ET edition of MSNBC Live, NBC News' daytime coverage platform. In January 2017, NBC named Jackson as its chief White House correspondent, while also stating that she would transition time slots and anchor MSNBC's 10:00 a.m. hour. On September 20, 2021, Jackson moved to the 3 p.m. hour of MSNBC Live. On November 17, 2021, Jackson began hosting Hallie Jackson NOW on NBC News' streaming channel, NBC News NOW, which streams Mondays through Fridays at 5 p.m. ET. Her streaming show will soon expand to two hours.

Honors and awards
On May 27, 2020, Jackson was invited to and gave special remarks at her alma mater Johns Hopkins University's 2020 commencement ceremony. Other notable guest speakers during the virtual ceremony included Reddit co-founder and commencement speaker Alexis Ohanian; philanthropist and former New York City Mayor Michael Bloomberg; Anthony Fauci, director of the National Institute of Allergy and Infectious Diseases and a leading member of the White House Coronavirus Task Force; and senior class president Pavan Patel.

Personal life 
Jackson and her partner Frank Thorp, a producer and off-air reporter for NBC News, announced the birth of their first child on March 9, 2020.

References

External links
 
 Johns Hopkins University article

1984 births
Living people
MSNBC people
NBC News people
American television hosts
American women television journalists
American television reporters and correspondents
Johns Hopkins University alumni
American women television presenters
People from Yardley, Pennsylvania
Pennsbury High School alumni